The 2021 Open de Oeiras II was a professional tennis tournament played on clay courts. It was the second edition of the tournament, part of the 2021 ATP Challenger Tour. It took place in Oeiras, Portugal between 5 and 11 April 2021.

Singles main-draw entrants

Seeds

 1 Rankings are as of 22 March 2021.

Other entrants
The following players received wildcards into the singles main draw:
  Pedro Araújo
  Nuno Borges
  Tiago Cação

The following player received entry into the singles main draw as a special exempt:
  Gastão Elias

The following players received entry into the singles main draw as alternates:
  Harry Bourchier
  Jonáš Forejtek

The following players received entry from the qualifying draw:
  Adrian Andreev
  Raúl Brancaccio
  Pedro Cachín
  Evan Furness

Champions

Singles

 Pedro Cachín def.  Nuno Borges 7–6(7–4), 7–6(7–3).

Doubles

 Nuno Borges /  Francisco Cabral def.  Pavel Kotov /  Tseng Chun-hsin 6–1, 6–2.

References

2021 ATP Challenger Tour
2021 in Portuguese tennis
April 2021 sports events in Portugal